Glyphipterix cultrata is a species of sedge moth in the genus Glyphipterix. It was described by Edward Meyrick in 1912. It is found in India (Assam).

References

Moths described in 1912
Glyphipterigidae
Moths of Asia